Sylvano Bussotti (1 October 1931 – 19 September 2021) was an Italian composer of contemporary classical music, also a painter, set and costume designer, opera director and manager, writer and academic teacher. His compositions employ graphic notation, which has often created special problems of interpretation. He was known as a composer for the stage. His first opera was La Passion selon Sade, premiered in Palermo in 1965. Later operas and ballets were premiered at the Teatro Comunale di Firenze, Teatro Lirico di Milano, Teatro Regio di Torino and Piccola Scala di Milano, among others. He was artistic director of La Fenice in Venice, the Puccini Festival and the music section of the Venice Biennale. He taught internationally, for a decade at the Fiesole School of Music. He is regarded as a leading composer of Italy's avantgarde, and a Renaissance man with many talents who combined the arts expressively.

Life and career
Born in Florence, Bussotti learned to play the violin beginning before the age of five with Margherita Castellani, becoming a prodigy. He was also introduced to painting, by his uncle  and his older brother Renzo. At the Florence Conservatory, he studied harmony and counterpoint with Roberto Lupi, and piano with Luigi Dallapiccola, but achieved no diploma due to World War II. He kept studying composition on his own. From 1956, he studied privately in Paris with Max Deutsch, and met Luigi Nono, Pierre Boulez and Heinz-Klaus Metzger who introduced him to the Darmstädter Ferienkurse. His first composition performed in public was Breve, played by Françoise Deslogères at a gallery in Düsseldorf in 1958, with John Cage in the audience. In Paris, Cathy Berberian sang his works, conducted by Boulez. Bussotti travelled to the U.S. in 1964 and 1965, visiting Buffalo and New York invited by the Rockefeller Foundation. In 1972, he visited Berlin, invited by German Academic Exchange Service (DAAD) for the Ford Foundation.

As a composer he was influenced by the twelve-tone music of Webern and later John Cage. Examples of his use of graphic notation in his pieces, often reflecting his personal life, included La Passion selon Sade and Lorenzaccio. He was a composer of the Florentine artistic current, that has been active since the end of World War II up to the present, including Giuseppe Chiari, Giancarlo Cardini, Albert Mayr, Marcello Aitiani, Sergio Maltagliati, Daniele Lombardi, and Pietro Grossi. These musicians experimented with the interaction between sound, sign, and vision, a synaesthetics of art derived from historical avant-gardes, from Kandinsky to futurism, to Scriabin and Schoenberg, all the way to Bauhaus.

Bussotti also pursued other disciplines including painting, graphic art, and journalism. He was a well-known film director, actor, and singer. He wrote most of the librettos for his operas. As a writer, his style was considered one of the most refined among the Italian poets and novelists of the 20th century. French culture fascinated him since he was a boy. His great friend Cathy Berberian (Luciano Berio's wife) was one of his most famous interpreters. He was well acquainted with writers and film directors Aldo Palazzeschi, Pier Paolo Pasolini, Derek Jarman, Elsa Morante, Alberto Moravia, Aldo Braibanti, Mario Zanzotto, Fabio Casadei Turroni, Dacia Maraini, and Umberto Eco. Jarman was the director of his opera L'Ispirazione, first staged in Florence in 1988. Rara Film is his most celebrated underground film. The silent film, according to the author's instructions, should be performed, together with the score, played by seven to eleven players. The music of Rara Film is not a strict counterpoint of the film, flowing without any relation to the images.

Bussotti was the stage director of Mussorgsky's The Fair at Sorochyntsi for La Scala in Milan in 1981, followed two years later by Puccini's Il trittico, a televised production for which he designed the set of Gianni Schicchi. He served as the artistic director of La Fenice in Venice, directed the Puccini Festival in Torre del Lago, and was director of opera at La Scala. He was head of the music section of the Venice Biennale from 1987. He taught composition, analysis and the history of musical theatre at the Academy of Fine Arts in L'Aquila, at the Internationale Bachakademie Stuttgart in Stuttgart, at the Royan Festival and from 1980 to 1991 at the Fiesole School of Music. As a personality, he was notoriously flamboyant and occasionally shocking. Openly gay, Bussotti expressed his sexuality in his music as early as 1958, when it was socially dangerous to do so. His partner and spouse was Rocco Quaglia, a ballet dancer and choreographer with whom he collaborated in many projects.

Bussotti died at a nursing home in Milan at age 89 after a long illness, shortly before his 90th birthday. In Germany, from September 29 to October 1, a scientific conference was held on Bussotti's work, in the course of which the Ensemble E-MEX played two commemorative concerts. This included the first complete performance of Bussotti's "Piêces de Chair II" (1960), sung, among others, by soprano Monica Benvenuti, who had long been closely associated with the composer.

Awards 
Bussotti was awarded the ISCM Prize from the International Society for Contemporary Music in 1961, 1963 and 1965, then in 1967 the All'Amelia Prize at the Venice Biennale, in 1974 the Toscani d'Oggi Prize, and in 1979 the Psacaropulo Prize.

Works

Music
Most of Bussotti's works were published by Casa Ricordi:

Stage works 
 La Passion selon Sade (mistero da camera), The Passion after Sade (chamber mystery) 1965

 Lorenzaccio, premiered at La Fenice in 1972
 Bergkristall (balletto, 1973)
 Oggetto amato, ballet in one act (1976),at the Teatro Lirico di Milano with Cathy Berberian and Claudio Desderi
 La rarità. Potente. premiered at the Teatro Regio di Torino in 1979

 Fedra, tragedia lirica, 1988
 L'ispirazione, melodramma in three acts, 1988

 Silvano Sylvano. Rappresentazione della vita, chamber opera in one tempo on words (testi) di Sylvano Bussotti (2002–2007)

Other compositions 
 Due Voci, for soprano, Martenot waves, and orchestra (text: La Fontaine (1958))
 Sette Fogli, for various solo and group ensembles (1959)
 Piêces de Chair II, for piano, baritone, female voice and instruments (1960)
 Pour Clavier (1961)
 Memories, 5 scenes for mixed choir, soloists and orchestra (texts: Braibanti, Pasolini e.a. (1962))
 La Passion selon Sade, chamber mystery play for voice, mime, actors and instruments (1965)
 Marbre, for 11 strings and spinet (1967)
 Rara Requiem, for soprano, mezzo, tenor, baritone,mixed vocal sextet, choir and instrumental ensemble (1970)
 I Semi di Gramsci, symphonic poem for string quartet and orchestra (1971) Score: Ricordi. World premiere: 22 April 1972 (Quartetto Italiano, ?, ?) dedicated to the Quartetto Italiano
 Sadun, for 12-part choir (1975)
 Amato object ('Bussottioperaballet' (1976)) 
 Raragramma, for orchestra and violin and flute obbligato. (1980) I. Raragramma; II. L’enfant prodige; III. Paganini; IV. Calando symphony. Score: Ricordi. World premiere: 20 October 1979 (Fabbriciani, SWF Sinfonieorchester, Bour) second part of the cycle "Il catalogo e questo"; dedicated to Romano, Rocco and Luigi Pestalozza and Francesco Degrada
 Modello, for violin and orchestra. (1998) World premiere: xx.04.2000 (Agazzini, ?, Tamayo) dedicated to S. Rocco

Novels and poems
Bussotti's writings included:
 I miei teatri, Il Novecento edition, Palermo, 1982.
 Letterati Ignoranti, poesie per musica, Quaderni di Barbablù, Siena, 1986.
 Sylvano Bussotti, nudi ritratti e disegnini, sketches with poems by Romani Brizzi, Trucchi e Bussotti, Il polittico edition, Rome, 1991.
 Non fare il minimo rumore, Girasole Edition, Ravenna, 1997.
 Disordine alfabetico, Spirali Edition, Milan, 2002.
 La calligrafia di un romanzo uno e due, novel in Peccati veniali, a cura di A. Veneziani, Coniglio editore, Rome, 2004.
 L'acuto, in Angelo d'Edimburgo by Fabio Casadei Turroni, Le Mondine Edition, Molinella, 2006.

Discography

Suono, segno, gesto visione a Firenze (Sound, sign, gesture, vision in Florence)
(CD 1): Sylvano Bussotti, Giancarlo Cardini, Giuseppe Chiari, Daniele Lombardi
(CD 2): Pietro Grossi, Giuseppe Chiari, Giancarlo Cardini, Albert Mayr, Daniele Lombardi, Marcello Aitiani, Sergio Maltagliati (Atopos music 1999-2008).The path of more than fifty years of musical culture in Florence, since the end of the Second World War, is documented in these two audio CDs. This audio recording contains the meeting of composers and pianists who are the protagonists of the Music of Art in Florence, a significant phenomenon in the history of the second half of the twentieth century.

Notes and references
Notes

References

Further reading

 Attinello, Paul. Signifying Chaos: A Semiotic Analysis of Sylvano Bussotti's "Siciliano", in: repercussions 1 (1992), pp. 84–110.
 Bortolotto, Mario. Fase seconda. Studi sulla Nuova Musica, Einaudi, Turin 1969. [especially the chapter "Le cinque tentazioni di Bussotti", pp. 201–226.]
 Bortolotto, Mario (ed.). "Sognato dalla storia": materiali per un "Lorenzaccio", in: Lo Spettatore musicale, Sonderheft, Bologna 1972 [with contributions from Mario Bortolotto, Giorgio Manganelli, and Salvatore Sciarrino].
 Bucci, Moreno (ed.). L'opera di Sylvano Bussotti. Musica, segno, immagine, progetto. Il teatro, le scene, i costumi, gli attrezzi ed i capricci dagli anni Quaranta al BUSSOTTIOPERABALLET, Electa editrice, Milano 1988.
 

 Degrada, Francesco (ed.). Bussottioperaballet: Sylvano Bussotti e il suo teatro: Oggetto amato ─ Nottetempo, Ricordi, Milan, 1976; [Bussotti: Cinque frammenti autobiografici, p. 13, the libretto of "Nottetempo", interviews and essays].
 Esposito, Luigi. "Un male incontenibile – Sylvano Bussotti artista senza confini", Bietti, Milano, 2013.
 La Face, Giuseppina. Teatro, eros e segno nell'opera di Sylvano Bussotti, in: Rivista Italiana di Musicologia 9 (1974), pp. 250–268.
 Lucioli, Alessandra. Sylvano Bussotti, Targa Italiana Editrice, Milan, 1988.
 Maehder, Jürgen, and Sylvano Bussotti. Turandot, Pisa (Giardini) 1983.
 Maehder, Jürgen. BUSSOTTIOPERABALLET ─ Sviluppi della drammaturgia musicale bussottiana, in: Nuova Rivista Musicale Italiana 18 (1984), pp. 441–468.
 Maehder, Jürgen. BUSSOTTIOPERABALLET ─ Zur Entwicklung der musikalischen Dramaturgie im Werk Sylvano Bussottis, in: Otto Kolleritsch (ed.), Oper heute. Formen der Wirklichkeit im zeitgenössischen Musiktheater, Studien zur Wertungsforschung vol. 16, Universal Edition, Vienna and Graz, 1985, pp. 188–216.
 Maehder, Jürgen. "Odo un Sylvano" ─ Zur Rolle des Komponisten, Regisseurs, Bühnen-und Kostümbildners Sylvano Bussotti im zeitgenössischen Musiktheater, Programmheft der Frankfurter Feste, Alte Oper, Frankfurt 1991, pp. 16–63.
 Maehder, Jürgen. ""Bussotti, Sylvano". The New Grove Dictionary of Opera, 4 vols., edited by Stanley Sadie. London: Macmillan Publishers, 1992.
 Maehder, Jürgen. Zitat, Collage, Palimpsest ─ Zur Textbasis des Musiktheaters bei Luciano Berio und Sylvano Bussotti, in Hermann Danuser and Matthias Kassel (eds.), Musiktheater heute. Internationales Symposion der Paul Sacher Stiftung Basel 2001, Schott, Mainz 2003, .
 Morini, Luciano. Moda e musica nei costumi di Sylvano Bussotti, Idealibri, Milan 1984; German edition: Aldo Premoli/Luciano Morini: Träume in Samt und Seide. Mystik und Realität in den Opernkostümen des Sylvano Bussotti, Edition Wissenschaft & Literatur, Marketing-und-Wirtschaft Verlagsgesellschaft Flade, Munich 1985, .
 Osmond-Smith, David. "Bussotti, Sylvano". The New Grove Dictionary of Music and Musicians, second edition, edited by Stanley Sadie and John Tyrrell. London: Macmillan Publishers, 2001.
 Pinzauti, Leonardo. A colloquio con Sylvano Bussotti, in: Nuova Rivista Musicale Italiana 4/1970, pp. 898–909.
 Stoïanova, Ivanka. Geste ─ texte ─ musique, Éditions 10/18, Paris 1978.
 Stoïanova, Ivanka. Mythos und Gedächtnis. Bemerkungen über das italienische Musiktheater: Luciano Berio ─ "Outis" und Sylvano Bussotti ─ "Tieste", in: Otto Kolleritsch (ed.), Das Musiktheater ─ Exempel der Kunst, Studien zur Wertungsforschung vol. 38, Universal Edition, Vienna and Graz, 2001, pp. 161–191.
 Stoïanova, Ivanka. Entre détermination et aventure. Essais sur la musique de la deuxième moitié du XXeme siècle, L'Harmattan, Paris, 2004.
 Stoïanova, Ivanka. Sylvano Bussotti: B. O. B.—Bussottioperaballet/Stratégies dissipatives dans "Questo fauno" et "Tieste". In Musiques vocales en Italie depuis 1945, edited by Pierre Michel and Gianmario Borio, pp. 29–60. Collection Recherche, edited by Sophie Stevance. Notre Dame de Bliquetuit: Millénaire III Éditions, 2005. .

External links

 
 
 

1931 births
2021 deaths
20th-century classical composers
21st-century classical composers
Italian classical composers
Italian male classical composers
LGBT classical composers
Italian gay musicians
Musicians from Florence
Pupils of Karlheinz Stockhausen
20th-century Italian composers
Pupils of Max Deutsch
20th-century Italian male musicians
21st-century Italian male musicians
Gay composers